Elos Elonga-Ekakia (born 5 February 1974) is a retired Congolese footballer who played at both professional and international levels, as a striker.

Club career
After beginning his career at AS Vita Club, Elonga-Ekakia later played in Belgium for Beveren, Lokeren, Club Brugge, Anderlecht and Royal Francs Borains.

While at Anderlecht, Elonga-Ekakia nearly died in a car crash.

International career
He was also a member of the DR Congo national team between 1994 and 1998. He has represented his country in 2 FIFA World Cup qualification matches.

References

External links
 Profile and stats - Lokeren

1974 births
Living people
Democratic Republic of the Congo footballers
Democratic Republic of the Congo expatriate footballers
Democratic Republic of the Congo international footballers
AS Vita Club players
Belgian Pro League players
K.S.K. Beveren players
Club Brugge KV players
K.S.C. Lokeren Oost-Vlaanderen players
R.S.C. Anderlecht players
1994 African Cup of Nations players
Expatriate footballers in Belgium
Democratic Republic of the Congo expatriate sportspeople in Belgium
Association football forwards
21st-century Democratic Republic of the Congo people
Francs Borains players